A list of princesses may refer to:

People

List of Princesses of Condé
List of princesses of Greece
List of princesses by marriage of Greece
Hanoverian princess by marriage
List of Princesses of Liechtenstein
List of Princesses of Orange
List of princesses of Serbia
List of Princesses of Soubise
List of princesses of Transylvania

Fiction and media

List of fictional princesses